Hanna Volodymyrivna Turchynova (née Beliba (Беліба); 1 April 1970 in Dnipro, Ukraine) is the wife of former Acting Ukrainian President Oleksandr Turchynov and a former First Lady of Ukraine. She is a Candidate of Sciences, Associate Professor and Dean of the Faculty of Natural Geography, Education and Ecology at the National Pedagogical Drahomanov University.

Biography
Hanna Volodymyrivna Beliba was born in Dnipropetrovsk on 1 April 1970. She graduated from the Oles Honchar Dnipro National University and completed postgraduate study at Kyiv National Linguistic University.

Since 1995, she teaches English at the National Pedagogical Dragomanov University.

Since 2006, she has been the head of the department of foreign languages at the National Pedagogical Dragomanov University.

Attack
On 25 May 2016 a man who arrived in Kyiv from occupied territory in Donbas attempted to stab Hanna Turchynova, the wife of National Security and Defense Council of Ukraine chief Oleksandr Turchynov, while she was at work. The attacker, Vladimir Olentsevich, a lawyer, threatened her with a knife. No injuries were sustained, and the attacker was arrested in time by police officers.

Olentsevich had been waiting for Turchynova outside her work office. Because the man was relying on a photo from the Internet, on which Hanna Turchynova had a short haircut, poor lighting led him to attack another teacher with a similar haircut. Having caught her by the neck, the attacker put a knife to her throat and shouted "Hanna Volodymyrivna, do not move!", advising her not to resist. Hanna Turchynova herself was standing nearby. When that woman began to shout, "I am not Hanna Volodymyrivna", there was a pause, due to which the guard who was there in the room managed to neutralize and disarm Olentsevich. As a result, the attacker was imprisoned for 8.5 years.

Anti-LGBT Remarks
On 15 June 2018 Anna Turchynova claimed that there is no discrimination against women in Ukraine and called representatives of the LGBT community a "deviation from the norm", homosexuality a disease, and a heterosexual family for a child "an ideal to strive for". She also argued that there are no violations of women's rights in Ukraine. Deputy of the Verkhovna Rada Olga Bogomolets supported the position of Anna Turchynova. On 20 June activists and representatives of human rights organizations demanded that the rector of the National Pedagogical University named after M. P. Dragomanov, Viktor Andrushchenko, dismiss Anna Turchynova because of public homophobia, referring to Turchynova's blog "Homo-dictatorship. Part 1. How to Corrupt Children." Also, the position of Anna Turchynova was criticized in the Ministry of Education and Science of Ukraine. 

On 25 September 2018 Turchynova said that with the help of gender ideology, the richest families in the world, as well as businessmen George Soros and Bill Gates, want to destroy the institution of the family in the world with the help of the UN and European institutions. She also added that human health and freedom, women's empowerment, quality services and reproductive health have become "seductive wrappers" in the overall strategy of population reduction. Turchynova argued that countries are trying to introduce into law norms according to which people could choose their own gender and "have the right to change it and their behavior at least 100 times a day," and gay propaganda is becoming the norm.

References

1970 births
Living people
21st-century Ukrainian politicians
21st-century Ukrainian women politicians
First Ladies of Ukraine
People from Dnipro
Teachers of English as a second or foreign language
Academic staff of National Pedagogical Dragomanov University
Oles Honchar Dnipro National University alumni